Events from the year 1651 in France

Incumbents
 Monarch – Louis XIV
Regent – Anne of Austria (until 7 September)

Events
The Lycée Stendhal was founded
Château de Maisons was completed

Births

26 February – Jean Beausire, architect, engineer and fountain-maker (d. 1743)
30 April –Jean-Baptiste de La Salle, priest and educational reformer (d. 1719)
27 May – Louis Antoine de Noailles, bishop and cardinal (d. 1729)
4 July – Honoratus a Sancta Maria, controversialist (d. 1729)
6 August – François Fénelon, Roman Catholic archbishop, theologian, poet and writer (d. 1715)
1 November – Jean-Baptiste Colbert, Marquis de Seignelay, politician (d. 1690)

Full date missing
Frère Jacques Beaulieu, urologist (d. 1720)
Magdelaine Chapelain, fortune teller and poisoner (d. 1724)
Jean-François Lalouette, composer (d. 1728)
Jacques-François de Monbeton de Brouillan, military officer and governor (d. 1705)
Philibert-Emmanuel de Froulay, chevalier de Tessé, army commander (d. 1701)
Guy Tachard, Jesuit missionary and mathematician (d. 1712)

Deaths
8 July – Charlotte des Essarts, noblewoman (b. between 1580 and 1588)
23 August Jacques-Philippe Cornut,  physician and botanist (b. 1606)

Full date missing
Angélique Paulet, précieuse, singer and lute-playing musician (b. 1592)
Catherine Arnauld, religious figure (b. 1590)
François II de Beauharnais, politician
Jacqueline de Bueil, noblewoman (b. 1588)

See also

References

1650s in France